Joseph Quiah (born 29 October 2005) is a Liberian footballer who plays for LISCR FC of the Liberian First Division and the Liberia national team.

Club career
Quiah played for Paynesville FC of the Third Division before being purchased by LISCR of the Liberian First Division in Summer 2020. He joined on a 3-year deal and scored in a preseason tournament on his club debut in October of that year. He went on to score three times in the tournament as LISCR were the eventual champions.

International career
In March 2020 Quiah was part of the Liberia national under-17 team that competed in a tournament hosted by Tanzania which also included Malawi and Zambia. Quiah was called up for a friendly against Egypt on 30 September 2021. He went on to make his senior international debut in the 0–2 defeat at age 15. He scored his first league goal on 6 December 2020 in a 2–2 draw with Nimba United.

International career statistics

References

External links
National Football Teams profile
Soccerway profile

2005 births
Living people
Association football forwards
Liberian footballers
Liberia international footballers
LISCR FC players